Boris Revut (also Boris Revout; ; born August 19, 1947) is a German-Russian chemist, inventor and writer.

Biography

Early life and education
Boris Revut was born in St. Petersburg, Russia to a scientific family. At school, he showed an interest in the natural sciences. He studied (1965–1970) organic chemistry at the Pedagogical University of St. Petersburg.

During his education he worked in a new field of phosphor-organic chemistry (Abramov reaction), that was connected with the organic aminophosphonic acids. These analogies to amino acids, important constituents of proteins, possessed the quality of complex ligands and medicines.

Revut graduated from university and his diploma was distinguished as one of the best by the union competition of young scientists. Simultaneously he studied contemporaneous English (language and literature) at the same university.

Revut took his doctoral degree at the chemical department of Saint Petersburg State University in the area of colloid chemistry and nanotechnology. His dissertation was dedicated to a new direction of force microscopy. He developed a method of determination of interaction force, which enabled to carry out the measuring of connection between surfaces with different nature. A researcher observed practically the contact time, which the micro-objects together remained.

Nano particles theory
Accordingly, it would have been calculated through the theory of interaction of nano particles the force of the desired connection. It was possible to investigate with this method also the adhesion  of the particles to macro surfaces as soon as the interaction of large biomolecules  between themselves. This work preceded the invention of first force microscopes. For the latter invention three scientists Ernst Ruska, Gerd Binnig and Heinrich Rohrer received the 1986 Physics Nobel Prize. The results of doctor's thesis Revut were taken in the textbooks of colloid chemistry .

Scientific expert
Later Revut worked for over 20 years at the large state scientific enterprise of the paper-pulp industry, where he went the way from an engineer up to a leading expert. He was busy with the environment protection), water purification, biotechnology and fine chemical processing. Throughout this extent, he developed the methods of removal of metal ions, petroleum products, poisonous organic substances, hormones, pesticides and gaseous compounds.

He elaborated the means for determination of heavy metals, trace elements, petroleum products, organic compounds, nano particles and bioactive substances in water and waste water. He improved the biotechnological processes of the yeast production, water purification and sludge utilization. His inventions were protected with more than 50 Russian patents and distinguished with prizes.

Manager and writer
In 1996–2002 he worked as a manager at the Institute of Biotechnology Applications in Environment Protection and Medicine in Hamburg. There he succeeded to implement some earlier scientific ideas of him.

Since 2006, he has been engaged as a writer and has written altogether 22 fiction and poetry books in Russian and German. In his novels he describes violent political and social themes of the past and present. His characters are representations of a lot of professions and social groups, who struggle for freedom and justice.

Personal life

Revut is married to the artist Natalia Revut who has illustrated his books. The married couple have a son and a grandson.

Works

 With rhymes through space and time. AT Edition, Berlin 2007, . 
 A touch of inspiration. AT Edition, Berlin 2008, .  
 The unexpected views. BOD, Norderstedt 2009
 The sketches of penetrations. BOD, Norderstedt 2010, .
 Face to face with the tyrant. Novel, Aleteja, St. Petersburg 2009, .
 A righteousness lesson. Novel, BOD, Norderstedt 2010, .
 Forward – to the past. Novel, BOD, Norderstedt 2010, .
 Under the constellation of Balance. Novel, BOD, Norderstedt 2011, .
 An occurrence and a fiction. BOD, Norderstedt 2011, .
 Hartz 007. Novel, BOD, Norderstedt 2012, 
 A biological neural network. Novel, BOD, Norderstedt 2012, .
 A secret of an oligarch. Novel, BOD, Norderstedt 2013, .
 A chase after the ghosts. Novel, BOD, Norderstedt 2014, .
 A criminal libretto. Novel, KDP, E-book, 2015.
 An invasion. Novel, BOD, Norderstedt 2016, .
 Secrets of pharmacy. Nonfiction, BOD, Norderstedt. 2017,
 A falsifier. Novel, BOD, Norderstedt 2017, ( (ISBN)978-3-74484-872-5))
 2060, Novel, BOD, Norderstedt 2018,  (()).
Regain one's sight, A poetry Collection. BOD, Norderstedt 2018,
The live do not pass by. Novel, BOD, Norderstedt. 2019, (
The steep ascent. Novel. BOD, Norderstedt. 2020, . 
The unforeseen circumstances. Novel. BOD, Norderstedt. 2020, .
The invisible friends and enemies. Novel. BOD, Norderstedt, 2021, .

References

1947 births
Living people
Russian people of German descent
Russian chemists